The men's light middleweight (71 kg/156.2 lbs) Full-Contact category at the W.A.K.O. European Championships 2004 in Budva was the sixth heaviest of the male Full-Contact tournaments and involved eight participants.  Each of the matches was three rounds of two minutes each and were fought under Full-Contact kickboxing rules.

The competition was won by Russia's Igor Kulbaev who defeated Hungarian Robert Arvai in the final match by unanimous decision - making it Kulbaev's second gold in a row at a W.A.K.O. championships (he had won at the world championships in Paris the previous year).  Defeated semi finalists Poland's Mariusz Ziętek and France's Ahmed Kouranfal won bronze medals.

Results

Key

See also
List of WAKO Amateur European Championships
List of WAKO Amateur World Championships
List of male kickboxers

References

External links
 WAKO World Association of Kickboxing Organizations Official Site

W.A.K.O. European Championships 2004 (Budva)